Massaguet (Arabic: مساقط, Masāqiṭ) is a city in Hadjer-Lamis region, western Chad.
An 86.6 km (87 km) highway completed in 1969 connects Massaguet with N'Djamena.

Demographics

References

Hadjer-Lamis Region
Populated places in Chad